The  is considered one of the classic books of ancient Chinese history. It is traditionally attributed to a writer with the surname of Guliang in the disciple tradition of Zixia, but versions of his name vary and there is no definitive way to date the text. Although it may be based in part on oral traditions from as early as the Warring States period (475–221 BCE), the first references to the work appear in the Han Dynasty, and the peak of its influence was the 1st century BCE.

Written in question and answer style, the work annotates the Spring and Autumn Annals covering the period between the first year of State of Lu ruler Duke Yin of Lu (722 BCE) and the fourteenth year of his later counterpart Duke Ai of Lu (481 BCE). It is an important book for the study of the development of Confucianism from the Warring States Period through the Han Dynasty.

Today, the book is usually considered to be the work of the Han Dynasty Confucian scholars and contains about 30,000 Chinese characters. Its focus is on clarifying Confucian debate on the political significance of the Spring and Autumn Annals in a style somewhat similar to the  but with many differences in both doctrine and interpretation. Its major concerns include the ritual code, political and familial hierarchies, and hereditary succession.

Notes

References
Bai Yulin 白玉林 and Dang Huaixing 党怀兴 (2006). Shisanjing daodu 十三经导读 [Reading Guide to the Thirteen Classics]. Beijing: Chinese Social Science Publishing House.  (paperback) Available online: http://lc.search.dglib.cn/ebook/read_11710055.html

External links

 《春秋穀梁傳 - Guliang Zhuan》 Chinese text at the Chinese Text Project
 'Gongyang's Commentary on the Spring and Autumn Annals' 《春秋公羊傳》 Chinese text with matching English vocabulary at Chinese Notes

Chinese history texts
Chinese classic texts
Confucian texts
5th-century BC history books
Zhou dynasty texts
Chinese literature
Thirteen Classics